Eternal Theater is a Christian documentary film directed by Daniel Knudsen. It was released to DVD on April 2, 2010. The film, an overview of the events of the Bible, was produced by Crystal Creek Media. The film is partially computer-animated and it was formerly titled Ultimatum.

Plot
Eternal Theater is a documentary that illustrates the entire story of the Bible and its message. It outlines the lineage from Adam to Noah, Noah to Abraham, Abraham to David and David to Jesus. The presentation recounts the prophets of the Old Testament and the prophecies fulfilled in the New Testament. From Genesis to the Revelation, the message of the Gospel is presented.

Cast
Because Eternal Theater is presented in a narrative style, the cast has only two members.

 George Sarris as the Narrator
 Daniel Knudsen as the Timekeeper

See also
 Christian film
 Crystal Creek Media

References

External links
 Official website
 

2010 films
2010 documentary films
American documentary films
Films about evangelicalism
Films about religion
2010s English-language films
Films directed by Daniel Knudsen
2010s American films